is a privately owned Japanese manufacturer of pachinko and pachislot machines established in Kiryū, Gunma in 1949. It is one of the world's largest maker of pachinko machines.

History
Born in Korea, Kenkichi Nakajima, then a student, came to Japan in 1937 and worked in a defense factory during World War II. In 1949, he established Heiwa ('peace') as he wanted to produce goods unrelated to war; it was, however, only officially incorporated on September 9, 1960. In 1988, it became the first over-the-counter company in the pachinko industry. It entered the Tokyo Stock Exchange on the Second Section in 1991 and moved to the First Section in 1997. In 1998, Heiwa acquired Olympia, another pachinko manufacturer, and turned it into a subsidiary company. Heiwa became the first company in its segment to have an ISO9001 in 2000. In 2004, it founded the subsidiary company PGM Holdings, a golf course operator.

References

External links
 

Japanese companies established in 1949
Amusement companies of Japan
Companies based in Gunma Prefecture
Electronics companies established in 1949
Electronics companies of Japan
Gambling companies of Japan
Slot machine manufacturers
Companies listed on the Tokyo Stock Exchange
Japanese brands